fripSide is a Japanese pop and trance duo originally formed by composer Satoshi Yaginuma (Sat) and singer Nao in February 2002.

History
In a 2008 interview, Satoshi said that he was a fan of TM Network and its member Tetsuya Komuro in his elementary and junior high school days and began to produce his music at the age of 14.

When the group started, they were releasing their songs on the Japanese amateur and indie community, Muzie. fripSide's albums were always high in sales at Muzie's online CD shop. As of July 2006, more than 6,000 copies of the three original albums have been sold.

They officially became a part of Visual Art's in 2006. They released their works under elseena-music entertainment and many of their songs were created for Visual Art's games, as well as other erotic game companies. In addition, fripSide had a side group, called "fripSide NAO Project" which started on March 30, 2007. fripSide NAO Project released songs different from the usual style of fripSide, and did not follow fripSide's motto of "creating songs that everyone can relate to". One album and one single were released under fripSide NAO project.

On March 15, 2009, Nao stated on the fripSide Official Website that she had graduated from fripSide. Sat and Nao want to pursue different musical careers, as Nao intends to pursue a solo singing career. Meanwhile, Sat will continue in fripSide with a new project called, fripside: THE NEXT PROJECT.

Voice actress Yoshino Nanjō replaced Nao as the new lead singer of fripSide. They re-debuted under the record label Geneon Universal Entertainment with single "Only My Railgun", the opening theme to the anime series A Certain Scientific Railgun, on November 4, 2009. The single debuted at the number-three position on the Japanese Oricon weekly single charts with the first week sales of about 26,000 copies, which was higher than the position of single "Flower of Bravery" (No. 26) in 2008. On May 8, 2013, fripSide release their 6th single, "Sister's Noise" which was used as the first opening theme for A Certain Scientific Railgun S and was their first-ever to reach #1 spot single in the weekly charts, #9 on the monthly charts, with 42,632 units sold for May beating Uta-Pri Maji Love 2000% Idol Song Singles.

On August 21, 2013, fripSide released their 7th single, "Eternal Reality" which was used as the second opening theme for A Certain Scientific Railgun S. The single was made in collaboration with Tetsuya Komuro for its composition and arrangement and was released into 3 editions, the Regular (CD only), Limited (CD+DVD edition) and Anime editions.

During the fripSide Announcement Special livestream on October 31, 2021, Nanjō announced her retirement from fripSide. She still performed with Yaginuma in a virtual concert on January 8, 2022, and will join him again at a concert tour in  April.

On April 24, 2022, the fripSide Phase 2 Final Arena Tour ended with the announcement of Phase 3's two new singers, Mao Uesugi and Hisayo Abe. Phase 2 singer, Yoshino Nanjo, performed "infinite synthesis" then was joined by Phase 3's singers during the song. The emcee then introduced the duo before they performed their debut song "dawn of infinity", which premiered as the opening theme to the anime series The Dawn of the Witch on April 8th. The single will ship on May 18th.

Members

Main members
Satoshi Yaginuma (nickname "Sat") (composer, arrangement, vocals, lyrics, synthesizer, guitar, programming)
Mao Uesugi (vocals, lyrics) - announced as one of the two lead singers of fripSide on April 24, 2022.
Hisayo Abe (vocals, lyrics) - announced as one of the two lead singers of fripSide on April 24, 2022.

Former members
Nao (vocals, lyrics) – graduated on March 15, 2009
Yoshino Nanjō (nickname "Nanjolno") (vocals, lyrics) – announced as the new lead singer of fripSide on July 28, 2009. Graduated on April 24, 2022.

Sound staff
Kenji (sound director)
Takumi Okamoto (sound director)
masa (chorus, synthesizer)
Mayu (guitar)
Takahiro Toguchida (guitar)
a2c (guitar)
Shinichiro Yamashita (lyrics)
Graphica3810 (design)
Kula (management)
riko (chorus)
Kai Kawasaki (nickname: "DJ Hentai") (arranger, DJ, synthesizer)
shin kurokawa (lyrics, composition)
Shinya Saito (arranger)
Hoshino takeshi (guitar)
Yagi kazumi (drum)
Kitamura Yuta (bass guitar)

Discography

fripSide (Nao)

Singles

Original albums

Other albums

fripSide NAO project!

Singles

Original album

fripSide (Yoshino)

Singles

Albums

Collaboration Singles
僕は僕であって (Boku wa Boku de Atte) [as angela x fripSide]
Release date : 19 October 2016
 僕は僕であって (Boku wa Boku de Atte)
 僕は僕であって (TV size)
 僕は僕であって (off vocal version) 
The end of escape [as fripSide x angela]
Release date: 7 December 2016

fripSide (Mao & Hisayo)

Singles

Albums

Video games 
{| class="wikitable" style="font-size:smaller"
|-
! Release Date
! Title
! Single
|-
| December 29, 2007
| ALcot Vocal Arrange Album Growing
|
 Triptych – fripSide arrange version
 Tsuki To Yume – fripSide arrange version
|-
| February 27, 2009
| RADiO Twinkle☆Crusaders vol.3
|
 Trust In You
 Trust In You (instrumental)
|-
| December 11, 2009
| Hidamari Basket Vocal Collection
|
 Hidamari Basket （Hidamari Basket Opening Theme）
 Prism （Hidamari Basket Ending Theme）
 Hidamari Basket （instrumental）
 Prism （instrumental）
|-
| March 26, 2010
| Areas～Koi Suru Otome no 3H～ Theme Song CD'''
|
 Closest Love (Areas ~Koi Suru Otome no 3H~ theme song)
 Closest Love （karaoke ver.）
 Closest Love （instrumental）
 Closest Love （short ver.
|-
| July 7, 2010
| Dance Dance Revolution X2Jubeat Knit (July 29, 2010)Pop'n Music 19 (December 9, 2010)Gitadora (February 14, 2013)Sound Voltex Vivid Wave (February 28, 2019)
| 
 "only my railgun" (also present in subsequent games)
 Pop'n Music, Gitadora and the 2021 jubeat feature a cover version.
 Removed from Dance Dance Revolution A in the April 2021 build
 Removed from Dance Dance Revolution A20 Plus on June 28, 2021
|-
| August 27, 2010
| Prism☆Magical ~PRISM Generations!~ Magical☆Vocal Collection'|
 Prismatic Fate （Prism☆Magical 2nd Opening Theme）
|-
| August 26, 2011
| "Ren’ai Katei Kyoushi Rurumi★Coordinate!" Original Soundtrack
|
 Miracle Luminous (Ren’ai Katei Kyoushi Rurumi★Coordinate! Opening Theme)
|-
| November 16, 2011
| Dance Dance Revolution X3 vs. 2ndMixReflec Beat Limelight 
| 
 "Future gazer" (also present in subsequent games until 2016)
 Exclusive to Asia; unavailable in North America and Europe
 Removed from Reflec Beat Volzza 2 on October 3, 2016
 Removed from Dance Dance Revolution A on November 7, 2016
|-
| February 24, 2012
| Hatsuyuki Sakura Special Soundtrack
|
 Hesitation Snow (Hatsuyuki Sakura Opening Theme)
 Hesitation Snow (instrumental)
|-
| May 25, 2012
| Hatsuyuki Sakura Complete Soundtrack
|
 Hesitation Snow (Hatsuyuki Sakura Opening Theme)
|-
| December 24, 2012
| Koiken Otome Vocal Collection|
 Sword of Virgin (Koiken Otome Opening Theme)
 Happy Go Round (Koiken Otome Ending Theme)
 Sword of Virgin (instrumental)
 Happy Go Round (instrumental)
|-
| November 29, 2013
| Izayoi no Fortuna Original Soundtrack CD|
 Fortuna on the Sixteenth Night (Izayoi no Fortuna Opening Theme)
 With the Light (Izayoi no Fortuna Ending Theme)
 Fortuna on the Sixteenth Night (instrumental)
 With the Light (instrumental)
|-
| March 28, 2014
| Clover Heart's -Reproduct mix-|
 Clover Heart's – Re:product mix full chorus ver.
 Clover Heart's – Re:product mix half chorus ver.
 Clover Heart's – Re:product mix off chorus ver.
|-
| April 25, 2014
| Koiken Otome ~Revive~ Original Soundtrack|
 Blaze of Reunion (Koiken Otome ~Revive~ Opening Theme)
 Blaze of Reunion -instrumental-
|-
|}

Contributions
magic "a" ride Vocal CD (Opening theme for magic "a" ride) - Released on July 4, 2008. This vocal CD was only a bonus disc for those who pre-ordered the game. Only the first track is done by fripSide.
Katakoi no Tsuki First Edition Special Vocal Collection - Track 2-4 were done by fripSide (Split Tears, Tomorrow, and Never no Astray).
spiral of despair -resurrection- (Opening for Chikan Senyou Sharyou 2 - Houfiku no Chijyoku Densha) - Under the name fripSide featuring Rita. This song was made after Nao left.
brave new world　(insert song from the Key/Visual Arts drama CD adaptation of Planetarian'') was done by fripSide.
Ryuusei no Bifrost (opening theme of Hyperdimension Neptunia) was done by Nao in 2011, after she graduated.
re:ceptivity (featured in Decade Album) is vocalized by Nao.

References

External links
Official website
Satoshi Yaginuma official website 
fripSide Hello!Music!! Web Radio (Archive)
muzie:fripSide

Japanese pop music groups
Musical groups established in 2002
2002 establishments in Japan
NBCUniversal Entertainment Japan artists
Anime musical groups